State Route 233 (SR 233) is a  route that serves as a connection between SR 129 at Glen Allen in Fayette County with US 278 west of Natural Bridge in Marion County.

Route description
The southern terminus of SR 233 is located at its intersection with SR 129 on the Fayette County side of Glen Allen. From the terminus, it takes a winding northeasterly route to I-22/US 78. After crossing I-22, it takes a northerly track to its northern terminus at US 278.

Major intersections

References

233
Transportation in Fayette County, Alabama
Transportation in Marion County, Alabama